Shout Out UK (SOUK) is a non-partisan social enterprise, based in the United Kingdom. Its mission is to strengthen democracy by providing training and programmes on media literacy and political literacy.

Shout Out UK was formed in August 2015 by Matteo Bergamini, whilst studying at Brunel University in Uxbridge. Shout Out UK have gained media attention for running the 2015 Youth Leaders' Debate, in partnership with Channel 4 and their collaboration with UK Drill artist Drillminister to encourage young people to vote in the 2019 general election. The New Statesman have named Shout Out UK's political literacy course as one methods of reviving political education in the UK.

Youth leaders' debate

Shout Out UK gathered all of the youth leaders of the seven major British political parties in one place to debate politics and youth issues in front of a  studio audience and live-streamed through All4, an online platform owned by Channel 4 News on 28 April 2015. The project was in partnership with Channel 4 News and received UK wide coverage.

The Youth Leaders Debate, hosted by Fatima Manji from Channel 4 News, differed from the main 2015 leaders' Debate by introducing buzzers. Seven themes were presented to the panellists, each had one chance to 'buzz in' and have one minute protected time for one question only. Representatives from all the major UK political parties took part in the debate.

Political literacy

After winning a local business competition called 'The Harrow Business Den 2016'. Shout Out UK's work shifted to media literacy and political literacy training programmes in schools and colleges.

Shout Out UK's political literacy course covers an introduction to the politics of the United Kingdom, international relations (including brief overviews of the European Union, NATO and United Nations), media literacy, debating and public speaking. The course ends with a Speech Night, during which students deliver speeches on issues they are passionate about in front of their parents/carers and local/regional/national politicians hosted at the school. The organisation aims to enhance students’ ability to influence local policymaking, to engage in activism and to build their overall Emotional Resilience and Confidence.

With the decline of citizenship education and no GCSE on Government and Politics, the political literacy course was noted by journalists at the New Statesman and National Student as signaling a revival of political education in schools. Shout Out UK was awarded the Harrow Business Den award in 2016. Due to its work in schools, Shout Out UK's founder Matteo Bergamini was asked to give oral evidence to the House of Lords Citizenship and Civic Engagement Committee, alongside Voter Registration charity Bite The Ballot that led to the report 'The Ties that Bind'.

National democracy week

On the 5 July 2018, Shout Out UK ran an event to ‘hack’ the problem Parliament has with the lack of representation of women, particularly those who are BAME or LGBTQ+. Despite 2018 marking the centenary of some women being allowed to vote, only 32 per cent of the House of Commons identifying as female that year.

The event was hosted by Alexis Wieroniey, an American comedian and women's rights activist. Speakers included Milly Evans; founder of Our Progress Project, Valerie Vaz, the Shadow Leader of the House of Commons and Andrea Leadsom the then leader of the House of Commons.

PoliFest 2019

On 25 June 2019, Shout Out UK hosted #PoliFest, a festival bringing together politicians and young people to play sports and debate politics at Brunel University. PoliFest aimed to bring politicians and young people together through playing sport and to break down the barriers between Britain's youth and the ‘Westminster Bubble’. The event was attended by both young people and politicians from across different political parties, including MPs Johnny Mercer, Nigel Huddleston and Tom Brake amongst others.

#NoVoteNoVoice & Political Drillin

For the 2019 General Election, Shout Out UK partnered with Drillminister, a UK Drill music artist who first appeared on Channel 4 News for his track entitled 'Political Drillin'. Drillminister and Shout Out UK created a campaign, entitled #NoVoteNoVoice, to encourage young people to register to vote and ultimately vote. The collaboration involved the creation of a track and music video entitled 'Peoples Vote'. The track was released on the YouTube channel Mixtap Madness. It later featured on SBTV and UniLad Sound.

The project ended with a concert held at Fairfield hall in Croydon on the final night before voter registration closed. That day it was estimated that over 600,000 people registered to vote, including over 250,000 under 25s.

See also
 Elections in the United Kingdom
 Politics of the United Kingdom

References

Educational organisations based in the United Kingdom
Educational organisations based in England
Political organisations based in the United Kingdom
Education companies of the United Kingdom
Organizations established in 2015
Youth in the United Kingdom
2015 establishments in England